Dib, dib or DIB may stand for:

Organisations
Danish International Brigade, a Danish military brigade
Director of Intelligence Bureau (India), head of the premier intelligence agency of India
Diyanet İşleri Başkanlığı, the highest Islamic religious authority in Turkey
Dubai Islamic Bank, an Islamic bank based in Dubai, United Arab Emirates

Science and technology
Device Interface Board, a component of electronic Automatic Test Equipment
Diffuse interstellar band, an astronomical spectroscopy term
Dry Ice Bomb, a bomb-like device chiefly in non-military/recreational use
Difficulty in breathing, medical jargon/shorthand
Device-independent bitmap, a possible file extension of the Windows Bitmap raster graphics format
Dual independent bus, a computer hardware feature
Droplet Interface Bilayer, a lipid droplet the forms a bio-membrane at an interface

People
Dib (name), several people with the given name and surname

Other
Defense industrial base, a political science and military industry term
Dib Membrane, a character from the animated television series Invader Zim
Dibrugarh Airport, by IATA code
Dictionary of Irish Biography
Disability Insurance Benefits, a Title II benefit offered by the US Social Security Administration
 Dib, a variety of the Yelmek language of Papua New Guinea

See also
Deeb